Scoposeni may refer to several villages in Romania:

 Scoposeni, a village in Gorban Commune, Iași County
 Scoposeni, a village in Horlești Commune, Iași County